The Seventh One is the seventh studio album by the American rock band Toto. It was released in 1988, and became the best-received Toto album since Toto IV. The title track, "The Seventh One", is featured only on the Japanese version of the album and on the B-side of the single "Pamela". It was also released on some compilations on a later date. It would be their second and last studio album with lead vocalist Joseph Williams until Toto XIV (2015).

Background and recording 
Steve Lukather described the writing of The Seventh One as a period of prolific "one-upmanship" with the band trying to impress one another with their compositions. One of the first compositions completed was the ballad "Anna", written by Lukather and Randy Goodrum. Lukather considers the song to be one of his best compositions. "Anna" was followed by "Pamela," written by David Paich, described as the "heir apparent" to "Rosanna." Paich and Lukather then composed "Stop Loving You," which both believed was sure to become a hit. Joseph Williams's influence on the album extended well beyond his vocals, with co-writing credit on six of the eleven tracks. The producer of The Seventh One, George Massenburg felt the album was missing a "rocker," which led to the composition and recording of the seven-minute closing track, "Home of the Brave." To assist in writing the lyrics, Toto called on Jimmy Webb.

During the recording of The Seventh One, keyboardist Steve Porcaro announced he was leaving the band. His decision to leave was partly influenced by his belief his contributions were not well represented in the band's music and a general feeling of being unappreciated. Porcaro was also noted to be unhappy with the level of drug and alcohol use in the band at the time. Despite his refusal to participate in the band business or publicity, Porcaro continued to contribute to the recording of The Seventh One and was paid as a studio musician. He also toured with the band in Europe.

Reception 

By its conclusion, Toto, as well as Columbia Records, believed The Seventh One was one of the band's strongest albums. The first single, "Pamela", was heavily promoted by Columbia. However, shortly after its release, the president of Columbia, Al Teller, left the label. In his absence, the promotion of "Pamela" waned and it stalled at number 22 on the Billboard Hot 100 and quickly dropped off the chart. "Pamela" was the band's last top 30 hit in the United States and Lukather described its quick drop out of the Hot 100 as "the moment that our star dwindled in America and it would take years for us to recover momentum". The Seventh One was the first Toto album since Turn Back to have fewer than two charting hits in the US, and was the lowest charting Toto album on the Billboard charts up to that point.

In Europe, "Stop Loving You" was the album's first single where it reached the top ten in several countries. Following the album's release, Toto embarked on a tour of sold-out arena shows in Europe. While Joseph Williams's vocals were not a point of contention during the Fahrenheit tour, he struggled with his vocals during the European tour, likely as a result of substance use. In particular, Williams was unable to perform during Toto's first show in Amsterdam, a show which was simultaneously broadcast live on national radio. Though efforts were made to control Williams's drug use, ultimately Jeff Porcaro fired him from the band. Williams was the third vocalist fired from Toto due to inability to perform vocals, following the previous termination of Bobby Kimball and Fergie Frederiksen. He would later contribute vocals to the Falling in Between album and return as the lead vocalist for Toto XIV.

Cash Box called the second American single "Straight for the Heart" a "plateful of pop rock, filled with hooks and dynamic production licks that cry out for extensive radio play" and "the strongest Toto yet."

Legacy
In 2017, Ultimate Classic Rock ranked the album as Toto's second best, behind only Toto IV.

Track listing

Personnel

Toto
Joseph Williams – lead vocals 
Steve Lukather – guitars, backing vocals, lead vocals 
David Paich – keyboards, backing vocals, lead vocals , horn arrangements , string arrangements , conductor 
Mike Porcaro – bass guitar
Jeff Porcaro – drums, percussion

and as guest musician:
Steve Porcaro – synthesizers, programming, electronics

Additional musicians

 Tom Kelly – additional background vocals 
 Patti Austin – additional background vocals 
 Jon Anderson – additional background vocals 
 Linda Ronstadt – additional background vocals 
 Joe Porcaro – vibes , additional percussion 
 Lenny Castro – additional percussion 
 Jim Keltner – additional percussion 
 Michael Fisher – additional percussion 
 Bill Payne – additional keyboards 
 Andy Narell – steel drums 
 David Lindley – lap steel 
 Jim Horn – horns , recorders , flute , saxophone 
 Tom Scott – horns , horn arrangements 
 Jerry Hey – horns , horn arrangements 
 Chuck Findley – horns 
 James Pankow – horns 
 Gary Grant – horns 
 Gary Herbig – horns 
 Marty Paich – string arrangements , conductor 
 James Newton Howard – string arrangements

Production
Produced and Recorded by Toto, George Massenburg and Bill Payne.
Additional Engineering by Sharon Rice, John Jessel and Steve Porcaro.
Assistant Engineers: Paul Dieter, Ken Fowler, Duane Seykora, Mark McKenna, Greg Dennen and Scott Symington.
"Stay Away" mixed by Niko Bolas
Mastered by Doug Sax and Mike Reese at The Mastering Lab (Los Angeles, CA).
Technicians for Toto: Bob Bradshaw, Ross Garfield, Paul Jamieson and John Jessel.
Technicians at Complex Studios: Paul Dwyer, Nathaniel Kunkel and Robert Spano.
Production Management: Ivy Skoff
Art Direction: Tony Lane and Nancy Donald
Design: Jeff Porcaro (front cover), Margo Nahas (illustration) and Philip Garris (original art).
Photography: Dennis Keeley (back cover/inside) and Glen LaFerman (inside).

Singles
 Stop Loving You / The Seventh One
 Pamela / The Seventh One (released in US)
 Pamela / You Got Me (international release)
 Pamela / Stay Away (released in UK)
 Anna / The Seventh One (released in US)
 Straight For The Heart / The Seventh One (released in US)
 Mushanga / Straight for the Heart (released in the Netherlands)

Charts

Weekly charts

Year-end charts

Certifications

References 

1988 albums
Toto (band) albums
Albums arranged by Marty Paich
Albums produced by Bill Payne
Albums produced by George Massenburg
Columbia Records albums
Albums recorded at A&M Studios